The Festa d'Elx Trophy is an annual football friendly trophy hosted by Spanish club Elche CF. Founded in 1960, it is the sixth oldest Spanish summer trophy. It is held on August 15 along with the Misteri d'Elx, also known as La Festa d'Elx, hence its name. The trophy is a reproduction of the Lady of Elche.

List of champions 

Notes

Most winners

References

Spanish football friendly trophies
1960 establishments in Spain
Elche CF